Marko Vujin (Serbian Cyrillic: Марко Вујин, born 7 December 1984) is a Serbian handball player who plays for SC Pick Szeged and the Serbian national team.

Career
Vujin started his professional career in his hometown club RK Sintelon, where he played with national teammate Žarko Šešum and Bosnian goalkeeper Danijel Šarić, who later won the EHF Champions League with FC Barcelona Handbol.

In July 2003, he was signed by the Hungarian Championship outfit Dunaferr SE, who were strengthening their squad for the forthcoming EHF Cup campaign.

Vujin spent three years with the Danube-side and collected a championship bronze medal in each season. Although during his spell in Dunaferr the club did not manage to break the dominance of the SC Pick Szeged–MKB Veszprém KC duo, he showed his unique scoring skills and was crowned as the top scorer of the Hungarian Championship in the 2005–06 season.

With his brilliant performances he drew the attention of MKB Veszprém, and the record champions secured the services of the right back in the summer of 2006. In his new club Vujin has grown into a player of the highest calibre and became the key of Veszprém's success. He helped the team to the EHF Cup Winners' Cup title in 2008 with scoring nine goals in the first leg of the finals, that was eventually won by the Hungarian club with a five-goal margin.

On 30 October 2009, while playing against Hungary in an international friendly tournament, Vujin suffered a serious knee injury that had to be operated. He underwent surgery on 4 December 2009 and the recovery process took four months. He returned into action on 3 April 2010 against HCM Constanța in an EHF Champions League match. He entered the field first in the 45th minute to take a penalty shot, which he missed, however, his teammate Carlos Pérez scored from the rebound. Few minutes later he got another chance from the line and this time he did not miss.

In the autumn of 2010, he reached his best form again and in the winter break he topped the EHF Champions League top scorers' list with 65 goals, sixteen goals ahead of second placed Uwe Gensheimer. His continuous superb play attracted the attention of THW Kiel, the Champions League winners of the past season, and the German club offered a contract for Vujin that Veszprem could not match. As a result, the Serbian international will now join Kiel in 2012, once his current contract expires.

He played for the Serbia men's national handball team at the 2012 European Men's Handball Championship and won a silver medal.

Achievements
Nemzeti Bajnokság I:
Winner: 2008, 2009, 2010, 2011, 2012
Silver Medalist: 2007
Bronze Medalist: 2004, 2005, 2006
Magyar Kupa:
Winner: 2007, 2009, 2010, 2011, 2012
Finalist: 2008
EHF Cup Winners' Cup:
Winner: 2008
EHF Champions Trophy:
Finalist: 2008
European Championship:
Silver Medalist: 2012

Individual awards
Nemzeti Bajnokság I Top Scorer: 2006, 2012

References

External links
Marko Vujin career statistic at Worldhandball
Marko Vujin player profile on MKB Veszprém KC Official Website

1984 births
Living people
People from Bačka Palanka
Serbian male handball players
Expatriate handball players
Serbian expatriate sportspeople in Germany
Serbian expatriate sportspeople in Hungary
Handball-Bundesliga players
THW Kiel players
Veszprém KC players
Olympic handball players of Serbia
Handball players at the 2012 Summer Olympics
Sporting CP handball players